Michel Biyoghé (born 9 December 1970) is a Gabonese footballer. He played in 20 matches for the Gabon national football team from 1993 to 2003. He was also named in Gabon's squad for the 1994 African Cup of Nations tournament.

References

External links
 

1970 births
Living people
Gabonese footballers
Gabon international footballers
1994 African Cup of Nations players
Place of birth missing (living people)
Association football defenders
21st-century Gabonese people